Tiphia is a genus of wasps belonging to the family Tiphiidae subfamily Tiphiinae. They feed on soil-inhabiting scarab beetle larvae.

The species Tiphia vernalis (Spring Tiphia) has been introduced in the United States from Korea and China in 1925 to combat the Japanese beetle (Popillia japonica).

Species
 Tiphia abnormis Eversmann, 1849 
 Tiphia alishana Ishikawa, 1967
 Tiphia ami Tsuneki, 1986
 Tiphia annulata Fabricius, 1793
 Tiphia antigae Tournier, 1901 
 Tiphia arthroxantha Boni Bartalucci, 2011
 Tiphia austriaca Tournier, 1889 
 Tiphia bexar Nagy, 1967 
 Tiphia brevala Zhang, 1989
 Tiphia bunun Tsuneki, 1986
 Tiphia chareshi
 Tiphia changi Tsuneki, 1986
 Tiphia chihpenchia Tsuneki, 1986
 Tiphia chungshani Tsuneki, 1986
 Tiphia copidosoma Nagy, 1967 
 Tiphia dimidiata Zhang et al., 1994
 Tiphia distincta Tournier, 1889 
 Tiphia dolichogaster Zhang, 1989
 Tiphia elachia Boni Bartalucci, 2011
 Tiphia eremopolites Boni Bartalucci, 2011
 Tiphia femorata Fabricius, 1775 
 Tiphia fenchihuensis Tsuneki, 1986
 Tiphia flavipes Tsuneki, 1986
 Tiphia formosensis Tsuneki, 1986
 Tiphia fortidentata Tsuneki, 1986
 Tiphia fukuii Tsuneki, 1986
 Tiphia hispanica Dusmet y Alonso, 1930 
 Tiphia hokkien Tsuneki, 1986
 Tiphia horiana Tsuneki, 1986
 Tiphia ilanensis Tsuneki, 1986
 Tiphia impossibilis Arbouw, 1985 
 Tiphia iracunda Nagy, 1967 
 Tiphia kashmirensis Hanima & Girish Kumar, 2019
 Tiphia komaii Tsuneki, 1986
 Tiphia kotoshensis Tsuneki, 1986
 Tiphia laeviceps Tournier, 1889 
 Tiphia latipes Walker, 1871
 Tiphia lepeletieri Berland, 1925 
 Tiphia lihyuehtana Tsuneki, 1986
 Tiphia maior Mocsáry, 1883 
 Tiphia mediovena Zhang, 1989
 Tiphia minuta Linden, 1827 
 Tiphia morio Fabricius, 1787
 Tiphia ordinaria (Smith, 1873)
 Tiphia parallela Smith, 1879
 Tiphia paupi Allen & Krombein, 1961
 Tiphia pempuchiensis Tsuneki, 1986
 Tiphia picta Schulthess, 1893 
 Tiphia piqua Tsuneki, 1986
 Tiphia popilliavora Rohwer
 Tiphia puliensis Tsuneki, 1986
 Tiphia rara Zhang et al., 1994
 Tiphia rufomandibulata Smith 1873 
 Tiphia sabaea Boni Bartalucci, 2011
 Tiphia sareptana Tournier, 1889 
 Tiphia semipolita Tournier, 1889 
 Tiphia taiwana Ishikawa, 1967
 Tiphia takasago Tsuneki, 1986
 Tiphia triangulata Tsuneki, 1986
 Tiphia tsukengensis Tsuneki, 1986
 Tiphia unicolor Lepeletier de Saint Fargeau, 1845
 Tiphia vallicola Tsuneki, 1986
 Tiphia varia Zhang, 1989
 Tiphia wushensis Tsuneki, 1986
 Tiphia yanoi Tsuneki, 1986
 Tiphia yushana Tsuneki, 1986

References

 Biolib
 Fauna Europaea
 Oisat.org

Tiphiidae
Hymenoptera genera